Studley Priory was a small house of Benedictine nuns, ruled by a prioress. In 1176, the priory received a grant from Bernard of St. Walery. The nuns were unhappy to be served poor beef and new beer on Thursday and Sunday nights, and no mutton. The priory was declared closed by 1536, but appears to have experienced a brief revival before its suppression in 1539.  
The priory lands were sold to the Croke family. The family built the house now known as Studley Priory, which still stands in its  of grounds, in 1587; a member of the Croke family was a judge in the 1649 trial of Charles I. The house and its estate (which comprised most of the village of Horton-cum-Studley) was owned by the Croke family until around 1870 when it was sold to the Henderson family, who occupied it until World War II. During the war, it was a sanatorium for Royal Air Force officers.

In 1947 the priory was leased by Raymond and Tessa Bawtree, who (with their partner, Wilma Hessey) ran it as a country-house hotel for the next 14 years. During that time, many eminent guests stayed there (including Adrian Boult, Gilbert Murray, Beverley Nichols and Sandy Wilson; it was a favourite hostelry of C.S. Lewis, who came regularly for a Sunday-morning beer after church and in later years stayed there with his wife Joy.
The Bawtrees did not renew their lease in 1961; that year the Hendersons auctioned off their estate, including the priory. The priory was bought by the Parke family, who continued to run it as a hotel until 2004 when the business was placed in receivership due to mounting financial losses. The business failed to find a buyer and the Priory was sold for reconversion to a private house.

The monastery is mentioned in the historical novel Blanket In The Dark by John Buchan who lived at nearby Elsfield. It was used as a filming location for the exterior of Sir Thomas More's home in the 1966 version of Robert Bolt's A Man for All Seasons (interior shots were done in a studio, not at Studley Priory).

Burials in the priory
William de Cantilupe (died 1251)
William de Cantilupe (died 1254)

See also
Alexander Croke

References

External links
A History of Studley Priory
Valuation of Studley at the Dissolution

12th-century establishments in England
1539 disestablishments in England
Benedictine nunneries in England
Christian monasteries established in the 12th century
Defunct hotels in England
Grade II* listed churches in Oxfordshire
Grade II* listed houses
Houses completed in 1587
Houses in Oxfordshire
Monasteries in Oxfordshire
Grade II* listed monasteries